The Glen Innes Examiner, previously published as the Glen Innes Examiner and General Advertiser, is an English language newspaper published bi-weekly in Glen Innes, New South Wales, Australia.

History 

Glen Innes is a rural town in the heart of the Northern Tablelands of NSW with a district population of approximately 9600.

The Glen Innes Examiner reports on issues affecting the town and district from 1874 to present.

The Glen Innes Examiner and General Advertiser was launched by Henry Cleave Vincent for the Vincent family on 5 October 1874. On 21 July 1908 the title was shortened to Glen Innes Examiner.

The majority of the 2,300 print run is sold over the counter at the local newsagencies who also provides a home delivery service.

Digitisation
The Glen Innes Examiner and General Advertiser, and the Glen Innes Examiner (issues from 1908 to 1954) have been digitised as part of the Australian Newspapers Digitisation Program of the National Library of Australia.

See also 
 List of newspapers in Australia
 List of newspapers in New South Wales

References

External links 
 Glen Innes Examiner
 

Newspapers published in New South Wales
Newspapers on Trove